The following is a list of the 45 former cantons of the Martinique department, an overseas department of France, sorted by arrondissement. The cantons were abolished in 2015, when the Assembly of Martinique replaced the General Council of Martinique and the Regional Council of Martinique.

Arrondissement of Fort-de-France (16 cantons) 
 Fort-de-France 1st Canton
 Fort-de-France 2nd Canton
 Fort-de-France 3rd Canton
 Fort-de-France 4th Canton
 Fort-de-France 5th Canton
 Fort-de-France 6th Canton
 Fort-de-France 7th Canton
 Fort-de-France 8th Canton
 Fort-de-France 9th Canton
 Fort-de-France 10th Canton
 Le Lamentin 1st Canton Sud-Bourg
 Le Lamentin 2nd Canton Nord
 Le Lamentin 3rd Canton Est
 Saint-Joseph
 Schœlcher 1st Canton
 Schœlcher 2nd Canton

Arrondissement of La Trinité (11 cantons) 
 L'Ajoupa-Bouillon
 Basse-Pointe
 Gros-Morne
 Le Lorrain
 Macouba
 Le Marigot
 Le Robert 1st Canton Sud
 Le Robert 2nd Canton Nord
 Sainte-Marie 1st Canton Nord
 Sainte-Marie 2nd Canton Sud
 La Trinité

Arrondissement of Le Marin (13 cantons) 
 Les Anses-d'Arlet
 Le Diamant
 Ducos
 Le François 1st Canton Nord
 Le François 2nd Canton Sud
 Le Marin
 Rivière-Pilote
 Rivière-Salée
 Sainte-Anne
 Sainte-Luce
 Saint-Esprit
 Les Trois-Îlets
 Le Vauclin

Arrondissement of Saint-Pierre (5 cantons) 
 Le Carbet
 Case-Pilote-Bellefontaine
 Le Morne-Rouge
 Le Prêcheur
 Saint-Pierre

References

 
Martinique 2